Pierrette Le Pen (née Pierrette Lallane; born September 10, 1935) is the ex-wife of Jean-Marie Le Pen and the mother of Marine Le Pen.

Biography 
Pierrette was the daughter of a wine seller from the Landes department in southwestern France. Pierrette's first marriage was to Claude Giraud in 1956, which lasted until 1960. After divorcing Giraud, she worked briefly as a model.

Pierrette Lalanne met Jean-Marie Le Pen in 1958, during a gala evening.  She married him on June 29, 1960 at the town hall in the 8th arrondissement of Paris. They have three daughters together, Marie-Caroline Le Pen, Yann Le Pen, and Marine Le Pen. Initially, Pierrette Le Pen accompanied Jean-Marie in his political activities. Although in 1972, she left him due to his extreme views.

In a 1987 interview with Playboy, Jean-Marie Le Pen, who refused to pay alimony to Pierrette, said that "If she needs any money, all she has to do is clean". Pierrette Le Pen then reacted by accepting Playboys offer to pose in a semi-nude maid's outfit, the photos appeared on the 23rd issue of the magazine, under the title "Madame Le Pen doing the cleaning while naked". Marine Le Pen said that she was "scandalized" by the actions of her mother and stated that "Today, after these photos, we can no longer consider her our mother. It's worse than really losing her, a mother is part of a secret garden, not a public dump". Their divorce was finally pronounced later in 1987.

See also
 Le Pen family

References

1935 births
Living people
Jean-Marie Le Pen
Le Pen family
French Roman Catholics
Spouses of politicians
French female adult models
1980s Playboy Playmates